"Write Me a Murder" is a television play that aired in 1965 as part of ABC's Wednesday Theatre. It was directed by Henri Safran. Murder mysteries were a popular subject matter on Australian television at the time.

Cast
 Rhod Walker as Clive Rodingham
 Alan Edwards as David Rodingham
 John Gray as Charles Sturrock
 Judith Fisher as Julie Sturrock
 Gwen Plumb as Elizabeth Wooley
 Bob Haddow as Constable Hackett

Production
The show was made in Sydney. Francesca Crespi did the design. Henri Safran, who directed, said the drama came from not wondering "whodunnit" but from "will the murderer get caught".

Reception
The Bulletin said "Safran   tried   to   force  life   into   the   mummified   corpse   of   another  of   those   traditional   British   murder   mysteries,   set   in   a   decaying   mansion   and  suffering   from   mouldy   plot."

References

1965 television plays
1965 Australian television episodes
1960s Australian television plays